Tung Shin Hospital, formerly known as Pooi Shin Thong, is a 346-bed tertiary acute care hospital in Jalan Pudu, Kuala Lumpur, Malaysia. The not-for-profit private hospital is accredited by the Malaysian Society for Quality in Health and ISO 9001:2008 certified. It started as a provider of traditional Chinese Medicine treatment in 1881, and the Western Medicine division commenced operations in 1985.

It owns and operates Tung Shin Academy of Nursing, a private nursing college located in Pudu, Kuala Lumpur, Malaysia.

See also
 Healthcare in Malaysia
 Tung Shin Academy of Nursing

References

External links 
Official Website
Official Facebook Page

Hospitals in Kuala Lumpur
Hospitals established in 1881